Gianni Garko (born Giovanni Garcovich; 15 July 1935), often billed as John Garko and occasionally Gary Hudson, is an Italian actor who found fame as a leading man in 1960s Spaghetti Westerns. He is perhaps best known for his lead role as Sartana, starting with the first official film If You Meet Sartana Pray for Your Death and starring in three sequels as this character, the role played by George Hilton in the third film in the series.

Early life and career
Born in Zara (now Zadar, Croatia), he moved to Trieste, and later Rome to attend university and drama school. His first prominent film role was a small but important part in the Oscar nominated Kapò (1959). His big break came when he had a role in Il Compagno Don Camillo (1965).

Spaghetti Western era and Sartana

Garko became a star in Europe in the 1966 Spaghetti Western film Blood at Sundown. In this movie, he played an antagonist named El General Sartana. In 1968 he played an unrelated protagonist also named Sartana in If You Meet Sartana Pray for Your Death (Italian: Se incontri Sartana prega per la tua morte). The movie was an immediate box office success, and led to four official follow-up Sartana films, with Garko starring in the first three of them: I Am Sartana Your Angel of Death (Sono Sartana, il vostro becchino, 1969), Have a Good Funeral, My Friend... Sartana Will Pay (Buon funerale, amigos!... paga Sartana, 1970), and Light the Fuse... Sartana Is Coming (Una nuvola di polvere... un grido di morte... arriva Sartana, 1970). (George Hilton starred in the fourth, Sartana's Here… Trade Your Pistol for a Coffin (C'è Sartana... vendi la pistola e comprati la bara, 1970.)

Other notable westerns Garko starred in were $10,000 Blood Money (1967) as an unofficial Django, Vengeance is Mine/$100,000 for a Massacre (1967), The Price of Death (1971), They Call Him Cemetery (1971) alongside William Berger as well as a supporting role in Bad Man's River (1971) with Lee Van Cleef. During this time he achieved considerable fame in Germany, Italy, and Spain. Outside of the western genre, Garko starred in Five for Hell (1969) with frequent co-star Klaus Kinski, a small role in Waterloo (1970) as the brave and energetic French artillery commander Antoine Drouot, and The Heroes (1973), both with Rod Steiger.

Post Spaghetti Western career
Like many of his contemporaries, his star diminished as the Spaghetti Western genre began to decline. He was still able to get roles in several successful Giallo and horror movies, sex comedies, and Poliziotteschi movies. Among these are Cold Eyes of Fear (1971), The Night of the Devils (1972), Il Boss (1973), The Flower with the Petals of Steel (1973), Sette note in nero (1977 with Jennifer O'Neill), Joy of Flying (1977), Graf Dracula in Oberbayern (1979, a Bavarian sex comedy), Star Odyssey (1979), Encounters in the Deep (1979), Hercules (1983 with Lou Ferrigno), and Monster Shark (1984).

After appearing in Space: 1999 (1975) as Tony Cellini in the episode "Dragon's Domain", Garko concentrated more on television, theatre, and TV commercials. Although established in Europe, he remained little known in America. In an interview, Garko mentioned that he had turned down the lead role in Pretty Baby (1978) with Brooke Shields.

Selected filmography

 The Mongols (1961)
 Mole Men Against the Son of Hercules (1961)
 Pontius Pilate (1962)
 Crazy Desire (1962)
 Eighteen in the Sun (1962)
 The Avenger (1962)
 Saul e David (1964)
 Il Compagno Don Camillo (Don Camillo in Moscow) (1965)
 $1,000 on the Black (1966)
 10,000 Dollars for a Massacre (1967)
 Giorni di sangue (1968)
 Vengeance Is Mine (1968)
 Red Roses for the Fuhrer (1968)
 If You Meet Sartana Pray for Your Death (1968)
 Lucrezia (1968)
 Five for Hell (1969)
 Thunder from the West (1969)
 Taste of Vengeance (1969) 
 I Am Sartana Your Angel of Death (1969)
 Tulips of Haarlem (1970)
 The Cop (1970)
 Sartana Kills Them All (1970)
 Have a Good Funeral, My Friend... Sartana Will Pay (1970)
 Waterloo (1970)
 Light the Fuse... Sartana Is Coming (1970)
 Il venditore di morte (The Price of Death) (1971)
 A Bullet for a Stranger (They Call Him Cemetery) (1971)
 Bad Man's River (1971)
 His Name Was Holy Ghost (1972)
 Night of the Devils (1972)
 The Boss (1973)
 Gli eroi (The Heroes) (1973)
 Those Dirty Dogs (1973)
 The Flower with the Deadly Sting (1973)
 Siete chacales (1974)
 Marco Visconti (1975, TV series)
 The Psychic (1977)
 Joy of Flying (1977)
 Three Swedes in Upper Bavaria (1977)
 In the Name of the Sovereign People (1990)

External links

 Shobary Profile 

1935 births
Living people
Male Spaghetti Western actors
Accademia Nazionale di Arte Drammatica Silvio D'Amico alumni
Actors from Zadar
Dalmatian Italians